Aida el Ayoubi (born 1964) is an Egyptian singer, songwriter, and guitarist.

Biography
Born in Aachen, Germany to an Egyptian father and German mother, El-Ayoubi studied at the Deutsche Evangelische Oberschule, then at The American University in Cairo where she majored in computer sciences.

She is known for her many Egyptian patriotic songs. She gained fame in the early 1990s in Egypt and the Middle East for her music.

El-Ayoubi completed three albums before going into a career hiatus following the birth of her first child. She is well known in Egypt and many other Arabic countries for her patriotic and romantic music, heartfelt lyrics, and her soft, soothing voice. She is best known for her hit song A'ala Baly which appeared on her first album.

Comeback
After more than ten years in retirement, El-Ayoubi produced a new three-track album, Tawasul wa Ragaa’ bi Jah Sidna. It is entirely religion-themed.

In 2011, El-Ayoubi released a single, Bahebek Yabaldy after the Egyptian Revolution, & Ya El Midan featuring Cairokee, which is also about the Egyptian Revolution in Tahrir Square in January 2011. She took part in another duet with Cairokee, producing the soundtrack to a 2013 media campaign launched by Coca-Cola.

Albums
 Ala Bali 1991
 Rafiq Umry 1992
 Men Zaman 1993

References

External links 
 Press - Ahram
 Personal website--under construction

1964 births
Living people
20th-century Egyptian women singers
Egyptian guitarists
Egyptian singer-songwriters
Women guitarists
The American University in Cairo alumni
21st-century Egyptian women singers